Marthamyces is a genus of fungi within the Rhytismataceae family. The genus contains nine species.

References

External links
Marthamyces at Index Fungorum

Leotiomycetes